Mangla Cantonment is an army garrison near Mangla Dam in Jhelum District of Pakistan. The town of Mangla and Mangla dam are located across the Jhelum river in Pakistan administered Kashmir. The antonment has an area of 1.2 km² with a population of 10,000.

Sherni, an Indian tank captured by Pakistan Army during the war in 1971, is kept in Mangla Cantonment.

History
During the construction of Mangla Dam, the area belonging to the villages of Baral, Baruti, Thill and Sultanpur was evacuated to build residential colonies and offices. After the departure of foreign contractors and their families in late 1969, the area changed hands from WAPDA to the army and was finally made a cantonment known as "Mangla Cantonment." The famous city of Mirpur is approximately 15 km from Mangla Cantonment.

Mangla produces about 1000MW of electricity for the Pakistan power sector. Furthermore, their canal system provides water for crops around the region. The Mangla dam holds vital significance in meeting Pakistan's water needs.

Before becoming Chief of Army Staff of the Pakistan Army, General Pervez Musharraf was the Corps Commander of Mangla Cantonment.

Healthcare
 Combined Military Hospital, Mangla
 Cantt Public Infirmary

References

Cantonments of Pakistan
Populated places in Tehsil Dina